Aje or AJE may refer to:

Aje
 Aje oil, obtained from larvae of the aje (coccus axin) used in Mexican lacquerware
 Aje, Ethiopia, the centre of the Shala woreda in the Oromia region
 Iyami Aje Yoruba concept of feminine power
 Kevin Joseph Aje, Nigerian Catholic bishop 
 Aje, Taje language

AJE
 AJE, a common abbreviation for Al Jazeera English, the English-language news channel operated by Al Jazeera Media Network

See also

 Ajay (given name), an Indian masculine given name (including a list of persons with the name)